Phloeoxena is a genus of beetles in the family Carabidae, containing the following species:

 Phloeoxena ashei Shpeley & Ball, 2000 
 Phloeoxena batesi Ball, 1975 
 Phloeoxena bembidioides (Bates, 1883) 
 Phloeoxena biundata Steinheil, 1875 
 Phloeoxena brooksi Shpeley & Ball, 2000 
 Phloeoxena caudalis (Bates, 1883) 
 Phloeoxena concolor (Ball, 1975) 
 Phloeoxena costata Darlington1937 
 Phloeoxena davidsoni Shpeley & Ball, 2000 
 Phloeoxena dealata Darlington, 1937 
 Phloeoxena geniculata Chaudoir, 1869 
 Phloeoxena henryi Shpeley & Ball, 2000 
 Phloeoxena herculeana Ball, 1975
 Phloeoxena imitatrix Darlington, 1934 
 Phloeoxena lamuralla Shpeley & Ball, 2000 
 Phloeoxena limbicollis Bates, 1884
 Phloeoxena megalops Bates, 1883 
 Phloeoxena montana Darlington, 1935 
 Phloeoxena nevermanni Shpeley & Ball, 2000 
 Phloeoxena newtoni Ball, 1975 
 Phloeoxena nigricollis Ball, 1975 
 Phloeoxena nitida Shpeley & Ball, 2000 
 Phloeoxena obscura Shpeley & Ball, 2000
 Phloeoxena picta Chaudoir, 1869 
 Phloeoxena plagiata Darlington, 1934 
 Phloeoxena pluto Ball, 1975 
 Phloeoxena portoricensis Darlington, 1939 
 Phloeoxena schwarzi Darlington, 1934 
 Phloeoxena signata (Dejean, 1825) 
 Phloeoxena totontepec Shpeley & Ball, 2000 
 Phloeoxena turnbowi Shpeley & Ball, 2000 
 Phloeoxena turrialba Shpeley & Ball, 2000 
 Phloeoxena undata Chaudoir, 1869 
 Phloeoxena viridis Shpeley & Ball, 2000

References

Lebiinae